Asboth or Asbóth is a Hungarian surname. Notable people with the surname include:

Alexander Asboth (1810–1868), Hungarian-American Union Army general
József Asbóth (1917–1986), Hungarian tennis player
Oszkár Asboth (1891–1960), Hungarian aviation pioneer

Hungarian-language surnames